Albert Louis Félix Ayat (15 September 1882 – 4 April 1972) was a French fencer. He competed in the individual épée at the 1900 Summer Olympics, alongside his elder brother Albert Jean Louis Ayat, who won the event.

References

External links

1882 births
1972 deaths
French male épée fencers
Olympic fencers of France
Fencers at the 1900 Summer Olympics
Fencers from Paris